Medical direction, or online medical direction, allows a paramedic or emergency medical technician (EMT) to contact a physician from the field via radio or other means to obtain instructions on further care of a patient. This is used particularly when a patient is in need of care that is not allowed without medical direction under the caregiver's scope of practice. For example, paramedic may be treating a burn victim in the field, and has already given the maximum amount of narcotic allowed without physician's permission. The paramedic will attempt to contact his or her base station hospital and ask for further instructions in order to provide the patient with pain relief.

There are two different types of medical direction. Direct medical direction, often called on-line medical direction, is when care is rendered under direct orders of the base station physician, usually over the radio or telephone. The other is indirect medical direction, or off-line medical direction, which includes the development of a set of written medical guidelines, or standing orders.

Emergency medicine